Vision Apartments is a residential skyscraper built in Melbourne, Victoria, Australia. As of August 2018, the skyscraper is the seventh–tallest building in Melbourne.

History
By early 2009, the Brady Group were proposing to build a residential skyscraper on a site adjacent to the Queen Victoria Market car park. The 1,030 m2 site, which previously hosted a 150–year–old hotel, was bought at an auction for $AUD11.8 million by the property developer, in 2008. After minor changes to design, The Brady Group officially re–launched the project in 2011, wherein plans were tabled for a residential skyscraper which would reach  in height. The proposal included more than 500 residential apartments spanning across 69 levels, in addition to three basement levels.

Approval for the project was granted in November 2012, by the then–Planning Minister, Matthew Guy. Construction on the $400–500 million project commenced in October 2013, whereby a completion date was estimated for some time in mid–2016. During construction, the Melbourne City Council discovered that two of three basement car-park levels had not been constructed, despite being present within the 2011 plans for the project; nevertheless, the developer had submitted minor planning amendments to Minister Guy, as to reflect the failure to build the two additional levels. By July 2016, the skyscraper had topped out, and had been completed a few months later.

Vision Apartments is currently the second–tallest residential building within the Melbourne CBD core, the seventh tallest residential building in Melbourne, and the tenth–tallest building in Melbourne overall.

Gallery

See also

 List of tallest buildings in Melbourne
 Nearby features
 Light House Melbourne
 Queen Victoria Market
 Victoria One

References

External links

Skyscrapers in Melbourne
Residential skyscrapers in Australia
Apartment buildings in Melbourne
Elizabeth Street, Melbourne
Buildings and structures in Melbourne City Centre
2016 establishments in Australia
Buildings and structures completed in 2016